XDV or xdv may refer to:

 Diazo (software), a website theming tool, previously named xdv. 
 Extended DVI, see Device independent file format